is a railway station on the Itō Line of the East Japan Railway Company, located in the southern part of the city of Atami, Shizuoka Prefecture, Japan. It is also a stop for the limited express Odoriko.

Lines
Ajiro Station is served by the Itō Line and is located 8.7 kilometers from the northern terminus of the line at Atami Station and 113.3 kilometers from Tokyo Station.

Layout
Ajiro Station has one  island platform on an embankment, with the station building located at a lower level. The station is unattended.

Platforms

History 
Ajiro Station opened on March 30, 1935, as the terminal station of the Itō Line from Atami; however, the line expanded to Itō Station by December 15, 1938. Freight services were discontinued on January 30, 1963. On April 1, 1987, along with division and privatization of Japan National Railway, East Japan Railway Company started operating this station.

Passenger statistics
In fiscal 2013, the station was used by an average of 922 passengers daily (boarding passengers only).

Surrounding area
 Ajiro fishing port
Ajiro onsen

See also
 List of railway stations in Japan

References

External links

 Official home page 

Railway stations in Japan opened in 1935
Railway stations in Yamanashi Prefecture
Itō Line
Atami, Shizuoka